Rodney Brown may refer to:

 Rodney Brown (athlete) (born 1993), American discus thrower
 Rodney Brown (cricketer) (born 1968), New Zealand cricketer
 Rodney Brown (equestrian) (born 1948), Australian Olympic equestrian
 Rodney W. Brown (born 1951), American producer of local and national television